Nathan Daniel Wolfe, Ph.D. (born 24 August 1970) is an American virologist. He was the founder (in 2007) and director of Global Viral and the Lorry I. Lokey Visiting Professor in Human Biology at Stanford University.

Career 
Dr. Wolfe spent over eight years conducting biomedical research in both sub-Saharan Africa and Southeast Asia. He is also the founder of Metabiota, which offers both governmental and corporate services for biological threat evaluation and management. He serves on the editorial board of EcoHealth and Scientific American and is a member of DARPA's Defense Science Research Council. His laboratory was among the first to discover and describe the Simian foamy virus. 

In 2008, he warned that the world was not ready for a pandemic.

In 2011, his book The Viral Storm: The Dawn of a New Pandemic Age was short-listed for the Winton Prize.

As reported in a Wired feature in 2020, Wolfe worked with the German insurance firm Munich Re to offer major corporate leaders pandemic policies, which were not purchased; a stark reality during the ensuing COVID-19 pandemic.

Awards
Wolfe has been awarded more than $40 million in funding from a diverse array of sources including the U.S. Department of Defense, Google.org, the National Institutes of Health, the Skoll Foundation, the Bill & Melinda Gates Foundation and the National Geographic Society.

 Fulbright fellowship recipient (1997)
 National Geographic Emerging Explorer (2004)
 NIH Director's Pioneer Award (2005)
 Popular Science: "Brilliant 10" (2006) 
 Rolling Stone: "Top 100 Agents of Change" (2009)
 World Economic Forum's Young Global Leaders (2010)

Press
Wolfe's work has been published in and covered by the popular media including The New York Times, The Economist, Discover and Scientific American. He has appeared on CNN and is a regular TED presenter. He has also appeared as one of Time magazine's "Time 100" for 2011.

Personal life 
Wolfe is married to the playwright Lauren Gunderson and has 2 sons. As part of his work, he has lived in Cameroon, Malaysia and Uganda.

References

External links
 Global Viral Forecasting Initiative webpage
 Profile of Wolfe in Forbes

1970 births
Living people
American public health doctors
American virologists
Harvard Medical School alumni
Stanford University alumni
Scientists from Detroit
Stanford University School of Humanities and Sciences faculty
21st-century American scientists